Daniele Mori (born 28 June 1990) is an Italian footballer who plays as a defender for Italian Serie D club Gavorrano.

He wore the number 25 shirt since the end of the 2008–09 Serie B season. He later changed to the number 34 for Brescia during the 2013–14 season.

Club career

Empoli
Born in Livorno, Tuscany, Mori started his professional career at Tuscan team Empoli F.C. Mori made his Serie B debut on 23 March 2010, replacing Andrea Cupi in the second half. Since the departure of Gabriele Angella to Serie A club Udinese, Mori became one of the starting centre-back to partner with Lorenzo Stovini. Mori played 20 starts in 2010–11 Serie B, shared the role with Lorenzo Tonelli.

Udinese
On 31 August 2011 he followed the footsteps of Angella to join Udinese in co-ownership deal for €2.1 million. That day the Udine club also bought the remain 50% registration rights of playmaker Diego Fabbrini for €300,000. Mori also returned to Empoli in temporary deal for 2011–12 Serie B as Udinese had plenty of defenders. Mori shared the starting role with Daniele Ficagna (while Tonelli sometimes as right-back).

In June 2012 the co-ownership was renewed. He also returned to Empoli for 2012–13 season.

In June 2013 Udinese signed Angella and Mori outright for €350,000 each.

On 3 July 2013, Mori signed a loan deal with Novara Calcio for the 2013–14 season.

Brescia
On 30 January 2014, he moved to Brescia in a co-ownership deal with Udinese. Half of his registration rights was valued for €2 million, however, it was part of the deal that Udinese signed Agostino Camigliano for €3 million. On 20 June 2014 Mori returned to Udinese for just €250.

Return to Udinese
In June 2014 Udinese bought back Mori. However, he spent on loan for 2 more seasons. In August 2014 he was signed by Ascoli in a temporary deal from Udinese. In summer 2015 he was signed by Lucchese again on loan. On 1 February 2016 he was signed by Santarcangelo in a temporary deal.

Sambenedettese
On 22 August 2016 Mori was signed by Lega Pro newcomer Sambenedettese in a 1-year contract.

Triestina
Mori joined Triestina on 10 July 2017. The promotion of the team to Serie C was confirmed on 4 August.

International career
Mori has played at every youth level for Italy, although he has not appeared for the senior team. He received his first call-up to 2005 Torneo Giovanile di Natale In December. He finished as a runner-up in a youth tournament held in Montaigu, Vendée, France. He played 2 out of possible 4 matches. (The coach use the combination of Masi (started 4 times), Profeta (2 times), Vincenzo Barbera (3 times) and Carmine Sarno (4 times)) Mori failed to enter the squad for 2007 UEFA European Under-17 Football Championship qualification nor in the elite round. He only played 3 friendlies before the tournament.

In 2007–08 season Mori returned to the under-18 team and played the only match against Serbia U-18 in April. Mori also played once for U-19 in March but failed to enter the squad for 2008 UEFA European Under-19 Football Championship elite qualification. In 2008–09 season he played all three matches of 2009 UEFA European Under-19 Football Championship qualification, which Italy did not qualify. In June 2009 he played for U-19 team (de facto U-20 but coached by U-19 coach Piscedda) in an annual fixture against Serie D Best XI. In 2009–10 season he was the member of under-20, the bridging team to U-21. Mori played two games in the 2009–10 Four Nations Tournament. Mori did not enter the squad for the 2009 Mediterranean Games nor the 2009 FIFA U-20 World Cup.

In January 2011 Mori received his first U-21 call-up from Ciro Ferrara. He made his debut in the following game on 8 February 2011, against England. Mori replaced Federico Macheda in the last minutes. Mori played 6 more friendlies for the Azzurrini, including 2011 Toulon Tournament (where he played 3 out of 5 games, with Capuano and Caldirola were the starting centre-backs). He missed the first round of 2013 UEFA European Under-21 Football Championship qualification due to injury and as an unused bench for the rest of the fixture.

References

External links
 Lega Serie B Profile 
 Football.it Profile 
 
 FIGC 

Italian footballers
Italy youth international footballers
Italy under-21 international footballers
Serie B players
Empoli F.C. players
Udinese Calcio players
Novara F.C. players
Brescia Calcio players
U.S. Triestina Calcio 1918 players
U.S. Gavorrano players
Serie C players
Association football central defenders
Sportspeople from Livorno
1990 births
Living people
Footballers from Tuscany